The Bavarian–Austrian Salt Treaty of 1829 (short Salinenkonvention) is the oldest European treaty still in effect. It was signed by the Kingdom of Bavaria (now the Free State of Bavaria) and the Austrian Empire (now the Republic of Austria). It gave the Austrians the right to mine in Bavaria in exchange for wood. An agreement to this effect had already existed for 600 years, and was formally regulated by a treaty from 1829. The treaty was revised on 25 March 1957.

See also
Hallein Salt Mine

References

Treaties of the Kingdom of Bavaria
Law of Germany
Hallein
1829 in the Austrian Empire
1829 in Bavaria
1829 treaties
Treaties of the Austrian Empire